Kushereka is a rural locality (a village) in Maloshuyskoye Urban Settlement of Onezhsky District, Arkhangelsk Oblast, Russia. The population was 7 as of 2010. There are 2 streets.

Geography 
Kushereka is located 947 km west of Onega (the district's administrative centre) by road. Abramovskaya is the nearest rural locality.

References 

Rural localities in Onezhsky District
Onezhsky Uyezd